Richard Lowell Russell (11 May 1922 – 24 January 1974) was an Australian rules footballer who played for Port Adelaide in the South Australian National Football League (SANFL).

Early years 
Russell was born in the seaside town of Port Augusta, South Australia.

Military service 
Russell enlisted in the army on 9 July 1942 and was discharged on 7 August 1946.

Football 
Due to his war commitments Russell made his debut for Port Adelaide at the relatively late age of 25. After his debut season he would represent South Australia in interstate football every year for the remainder of his career. During the 1950 Brisbane Carnival, Richard's performances in the back pocket for South Australia gained him a spot in the Sporting Life team, a forerunner to the modern All-Australian team concept. He would win his only premiership during the 1951 SANFL season.

References

Australian rules footballers from South Australia
Port Adelaide Football Club (SANFL) players
Port Adelaide Football Club players (all competitions)
1922 births
1974 deaths
Australian Army personnel of World War II
Australian Army soldiers